"Shake It Off" is a 2014 song by Taylor Swift.

Shake It Off may also refer to:

Songs
"Shake It Off" (Mariah Carey song), 2005
"Shake It Off", a 1978 song by B. T. Express from Shout! (Shout It Out)
"Shake It Off", a 1983 song by Stiff Little Fingers, later included on Get a Life
"Shake It Off", a 1998 song by Spoon from A Series of Sneaks
"Shake It Off", a 1998 song by Robert Bradley's Blackwater Surprise
"Shake It Off", a 2000 song by Take 5
"Shake It Off", a 2000 song by Wilco from Sky Blue Sky
"Shake It Off", a 2001 song by Henry Threadgill from Everybodys Mouth's a Book
"Shake It Off", a 2002 song by DJ Jazzy Jeff from The Magnificent
"Shake It Off", a 2002 song by Tela from Double Dose
"Shake It Off", a 2004 song by Mandy Moore from The Best of Mandy Moore
"Shake It Off", a 2005 song by GoGoGo Airheart from Rats! Sing! Sing!
"Shake It Off", a 2005 song by Hi-Five from The Return
"Shake It Off", a 2005 song by Lyrics Born from Same !@$ Different Day
"Shake It Off", a 2005 song by Supersuckers from Devil's Food
"Shake It Off", a 2006 song by El Perro del Mar from El Perro del Mar
"Shake It Off", a 2006 song by Krystal Meyers from Dying for a Heart
"Shake It Off", a 2007 song by Annabel Fay from Annabel Fay
"Shake It Off", a 2007 song by Corbin Bleu from Another Side
"Shake It Off", a 2007 song by Dizmas from Tension
"Shake It Off", a 2007 song by Joseph Arthur & the Lonely Astronauts from Let's Just Be
"Shake It Off", a 2009 song by Agnes Monica from Sacredly Agnezious
"Shake It Off", a 2009 song by KJ-52 from Five-Two Television
"Shake It Off", a 2011 song by The Medics
"Shake It Off", a 2012 song by Meisa Kuroki from Unlocked
"Shake It Off", a 2013 song by JT Curtis
"Shake It Off", a 2013 song by Michael Martin Murphey from Red River Drifter
"Shake It Off", a 2013 song by Secondhand Serenade
"Shake It Off", a 2013 song by The Blow Monkeys
"Shake It Off", a 2013 song by The Spinto Band
"Shake It Off", a 2015 song by Hurry
"Shake It Off", a song by Hal Linton
"Shake It Off (Walking With The King of Funk)", a 2004 song by Stripper's Union from Stripper's Union Local 518

Albums
Shake It Off, a 2002 album by Gerald Eaton
Shake It Off, a 2008 album by Chevelle Franklyn
Shake It Off, a 2010 album by Brooke Miller
Shake It Off, a 2013 album by Ash Bowers